The Ste. Genevieve Limestone is a geologic formation named for Ste. Genevieve, Missouri where it is exposed and was first described. It is a thick-bedded limestone that overlies the St. Louis Limestone. Both are Mississippian in age. The St. Louis Limestone is Meramecian and the Ste. Genevieve is the base of the Chesterian series.

It is a primary producer in the Illinois Basin and has produced commercial oil and gas in Warren County, Kentucky.

See also
List of types of limestone

References

Mississippian Missouri
Limestone formations of the United States
Mississippian Illinois
Carboniferous geology of Virginia
Carboniferous southern paleotropical deposits